Sir Samuel Canning (1823–1908) was an English pioneer of submarine telegraphy.

Life
Born at Ogbourne St. Andrew, Wiltshire, on 21 July 1823, he was son of Robert Canning of Ogbourne and his wife Frances Hyde; he was educated at Salisbury.

Canning gained his first engineering experience (1844–9) as assistant to Messrs. Locke & Errington on the Great Western Railway extensions, and as resident engineer on the Liverpool, Ormskirk and Preston railway.

Undersea cables
In 1852, Canning turned to submarine telegraphy, and with Messrs. Glass & Elliot laid in 1855–6 his first cable: it connected Cape Breton Island with Newfoundland. In 1857 he assisted Charles Bright in the construction and laying of the first Atlantic cable, and he was on board HMS Agamemnon during the submerging of the cable in 1857 and 1858. Following 1865, for the same employers, he laid cables in the deep waters of the Mediterranean and other seas.

When the Telegraph Construction and Maintenance Company was formed in 1865, Canning was appointed its chief engineer. He had charge of the manufacture and laying of the transatlantic telegraph cables of 1865 and 1866, for which the company were the contractors. This work involved the fitting-out of the SS Great Eastern. On 2 August 1865 the cable broke in 2000 fathoms of water. After a second cable had been successfully laid by the Great Eastern (13–27 July 1866) Canning set to work to recover the broken cable, using special grappling machinery, which he devised for the purpose. After several failures the cable was eventually recovered on 2 September 1866.

For these services, Canning was knighted in 1866, and Luís I of Portugal conferred on him the Order of St. Jago d'Espada. In 1869, he laid the French Atlantic cable between Brest and Duxbury, Massachusetts.

Later life
After retiring from the Telegraph Construction Company, Canning practiced as a consulting engineer in matters connected with telegraphy, and, among other work, superintended the laying of the Marseilles-Algiers and other cables for the India Rubber, Gutta Percha and Telegraph Works Company. He acted later as adviser to the West Indian, Panama and other telegraph companies. He was a member of the Institution of Civil Engineers (from 1 February 1876) and the Institution of Electrical Engineers.

Canning died at 1 Inverness Gardens, Kensington, on 24 September 1908, and was buried in Kensal Green cemetery.

Family
Canning married in 1859. His wife, Elizabeth Anne, died in 1909. She was the daughter of W. H. Gale of Grately, Hampshire. The couple had three sons and three daughters.

Notes

Attribution

1823 births
1908 deaths
English electrical engineers
People from Wiltshire
Recipients of the Order of Saint James of the Sword
Burials at Kensal Green Cemetery
Submarine communications cables